John Junior Bell (May 15, 1910 – January 24, 1963) was a U.S. Representative from Texas.

Born in Cuero, Texas, Bell attended the public schools and graduated from the University of Texas at Austin in 1932 and from its law school in 1936. He was admitted to the bar in 1936 and commenced the practice of law in Cuero, Texas. He served in the Texas State House of Representatives from 1937 to 1947. In his private life, he was president of a company operating compresses in Victoria, Shiner, Cuero, and Taft, Texas. During World War II, he served as a private in the United States Army from May 1944 to March 1945.

He served as member of the Texas State Senate from 1947 to 1954, participating as a delegate to the Democratic National Conventions of 1948 and 1952.

Bell was elected as a Democrat to the Eighty-fourth Congress (January 3, 1955 – January 3, 1957), when he was one of the majority of the Texan delegation to decline to sign the 1956 Southern Manifesto opposing the desegregation of public schools ordered by the Supreme Court in Brown v. Board of Education. He was an unsuccessful candidate for renomination in 1956.

After his political service ended, he continued as a lawyer, rancher, and farmer in Cuero, Texas, until his death January 24, 1963. He was interred in Hillside Cemetery.

Sources

1910 births
1963 deaths
United States Army personnel of World War II
Democratic Party Texas state senators
University of Texas School of Law alumni
United States Army soldiers
Democratic Party members of the United States House of Representatives from Texas
20th-century American politicians
People from Cuero, Texas